The Highveld Classic was a golf tournament on the Southern Africa based Sunshine Tour. It was held annually at Witbank Golf Club in Witbank on the highveld of Mpumalanga, South Africa from 1979 to 2009.

Winners

References

Former Sunshine Tour events
Golf tournaments in South Africa
Recurring sporting events established in 1979
Recurring sporting events disestablished in 2009
1979 establishments in South Africa
2009 disestablishments in South Africa